Muhammad Syafik bin Ismail (born 1 March 2000) is a Malaysian professional footballer who plays as a winger for Malaysia Super League club Terengganu.

Career statistics

Club

Honours

Terengganu
 Malaysia Super League runner-up: 2022

References

External links
 

2000 births
Living people
Malaysian footballers
Terengganu F.C. II players
Terengganu FC players
Malaysia Premier League players
Malaysia Super League players
Malaysian people of Malay descent
Association football midfielders
Association football wingers
Competitors at the 2021 Southeast Asian Games
Southeast Asian Games competitors for Malaysia